Bongaigaon Refinery is an oil refinery and petrochemical complex located in the city of Bongaigaon in the administrative district of Chirang in Assam. It was announced in 1969 and construction began in 1972.

History
On 5 December 1972, the then Prime Minister of India, Indira Gandhi announced in the Lok Sabha the Government's decision to set up a new Refinery-cum-Petrochemical complex in Assam. The foundation stone of the complex was laid on 19 January 1972 at Bongaigaon. Bongaigaon Refinery and Petrochemicals Limited (BRPL) was incorporated as Government of India Undertaking under the administrative control of the Ministry of Petroleum and Natural Gas on 20 February 1974. The company became a subsidiary of IndianOil (IOC) on 29 March 2001 after disinvestments of share by Govt of India.

BRPL has the distinction of being the first indigenous grass root Refinery in the country integrated with a Petrochemical complex at one location.

At present, the Refinery is processing crude available from the oil fields of ONGC and OIL located in the North-East India and Ravva crude oil from the Krishna Godavari basin off the coast of Andhra Pradesh.

The capacity of the Refinery was augmented in 1995 to 2.35 million tonnes per year (51,400 barrels per stream day ) through expansion of the Refinery consisting of one Crude Distillation Unit (CDU-II) and one Delayed Coking Unit (DCU-II). A LPG bottling plant of capacity 22000 MTPA was added to the complex and commissioned in March 2003.

When oil was found in Assam in the 1960s, the Assamese wanted this refined within the state. But Assamese consumption of products was tiny: most of the consumption would be in West Bengal and Bihar. So the government decided to pump Assamese crude to a refinery at Barauni, Bihar. However, Assamese students protested, and blockaded oil supply in 1980. A committee was appointed to suggest a new refining location within Assam. The students thought this would be near the oilfields. Instead the committee suggested Bongaigaon, far away from the oilfields and as close as possible to West Bengal, which would consume most of the products. This was a compromise between the politics and economics of refinery location.
The refinery recently merged with the IOCL in 2009.

Sources

External links
www.swaminomics.org

Energy in Assam
Oil refineries in India
Companies based in Assam
Indian Oil Corporation buildings and structures
1972 establishments in Assam
Indian companies established in 1972